Vrbovec (in older sources also Verbovic;  or Tiefenthal) is an abandoned settlement in the Municipality of Kočevje in southern Slovenia. It was inhabited by Gottschee Germans. In 1941, during the Second World War, its population was evicted. The area is part of the traditional region of Lower Carniola and is now included in the Southeast Slovenia Statistical Region.

The local church was dedicated to Our Lady of the Snows and was a pilgrimage church. It was demolished in 1951.

References

External links

Vrbovec on Geopedia
Pre–World War II List of oeconyms and family names in Vrbovec

Populated places in the Municipality of Kočevje